The Zeppelin Museum Friedrichshafen is a museum in Friedrichshafen in Germany, the birthplace of the Zeppelin airship. The museum houses the largest collection on airship travel in the world, and chronicles the history of the Zeppelin airships. In addition, it is the only museum in Germany that combines technology and art. The museum has been in its current location at the Hafenbahnhof (harbour railway station) since it was reopened in 1996. The exhibition was designed by HG Merz.

Museum concept
In keeping with the museum concept of "Technology and Art", visitors can see for themselves how closely these two areas are related. The work of art Zeppelin Swarms by Héctor Zamora illustrates this particularly well. The focus is on man and his position in the interplay between technology, nature, and faith. The art collection also includes works by those identified as degenerate artists by Nazi Germany, such as Otto Dix.

Technology collection
The centerpiece of the zeppelin displays is a full-scale, partial model of the airship LZ 129 Hindenburg. The exhibition also includes an original engine nacelle of the LZ 127 Graf Zeppelin airship and a Maybach Zeppelin car. A great number of airship models, not only from Germany, are also on display in the technology department.

LZ 129 Hindenburg

As said above, the centerpiece of the Zeppelin airship display is the full-scale, partial replica of the LZ 129 Hindenburg, which was reproduced true to the original and authentically furnished. It is 33 m in length, large enough to convey an idea of the enormous dimensions of the original airship.

The Hindenburg was 245 m long and had a maximum diameter of 41.2 m. It was propelled by four Daimler Benz diesel engines with a capacity of 772.3 kW (1050 hp) each, and reached a maximum speed of about 130 km/h.

After the impressive overview of the partial model from the outside, the folded-down retractable aluminium stepladder invites visitors to go on board. It leads into the lower deck, the B-deck, which has a bar, a smokers’ lounge, and toilets. The passenger cabins are arranged on two decks, stacked one on top of the other.  In the cabins, visitors can experience the special inside ambience of a 1930s airship and get to know the technical aspects of this aircraft.

The beds inside the cabins are made of aluminium. Every cabin has a wall-hung wash basin (with running hot and cold water from a tap), a curtained wardrobe niche, a folding table, a stool, and a ladder for climbing into the upper bunk. The cabins also have electrical lighting and are ventilated and heated.

The Hindenburg travelled 18 times to North and South America. On 6 May 1937, while landing in Lakehurst, New Jersey, the airship burst into flames just before touch-down and crashed.

Engine nacelle of the LZ 127 Graf Zeppelin
The nacelle was built in 1928 by the Luftschiffbau Zeppelin GmbH for the LZ 127 Graf Zeppelin (Count Zeppelin). The propulsion system of this airship consisted of five nacelles fixed to the hull. Every nacelle contained a Maybach engine, type VL 2, which drove a propeller at the nacelle’s tail. A mechanic was stationed at each engine at all times.

The nacelles had aluminium skeletons, the bottom halves of which were clad with aluminium sheeting and the tops with cotton cloth. A hatch, fitted with a connecting ladder to the main body of the airship, enabled the mechanics to climb in or out of the nacelles when their shifts changed.

Maybach Zeppelin
This Maybach Zeppelin was built in 1938 in Friedrichshafen. The car weighs 3.6 tons and can achieve a maximum speed of 170 km/h. Its engine has twelve cylinders with a total stroke volume of 8 litres and a capacity of 147 kW (200 hp). The engineering design for this car was based on the Maybach engines for the airships LZ 126 (1924) and LZ 127 Graf Zeppelin (1928).

Media room
The media room presents 3D historic photographs of zeppelins. In addition, historical footage can be played.

Zeppelin Cabinet of Curiosities
The cabinet hosts many small pieces of zeppelin history: coins, porcelain, postal documents, tin toys, and Zeppelin bibelot of all kinds. Numerous exhibits are presented in large display cases. Additional background information can be found on iPads showing 3D models of the exhibits.

Uplift, Propulsion, Aerodynamics – Giants in Motion
This wing of the museum is specially designed for children and young-at-hearts. Numerous experiments, original exhibits, and touchable replicas invite visitors to interact with the displays and try them out on their own.

Art collection

In the art collection, the connection between art and the subject of Zeppelins is established. The present collection was started in 1948, as the old museum had been completely destroyed by bombs during World War II. Of particular importance are works of art by artists who went into Inner Emigration at the time of the Third Reich and retired to the Lake Constance region like Otto Dix, Max Ackermann, Willi Baumeister, Erich Heckel, Julius Bissier, and others.

Héctor Zamora's Sciame de dirigibili – Zeppelin Swarms
The first of the art exhibits to be encountered in the museum, these little Zeppelins are part of the art work Zeppelin Swarms by Héctor Zamora (1974, Mexico City, Mexico) which defines the connection between the technology and the art departments.

His project, first shown at the 53rd Venice Biennale, stimulates the viewer's imagination. The visitors become witnesses to an event in Venice that actually never happened, an invasion of Venice by a large number of Zeppelins. For this purpose, Zamora shows the Zeppelin swarm in different art genres: post cards, drawings, paintings by venetian street artists, advertisement in the press, and an animated video which was spread on the internet. While actual swarm of zeppelins over Venice did not take place, the photographs are very realistic.

The only real and visible element that actually appeared in the cityscape of Venice was an airship, which was shown stuck between two houses. Now, its deflated hull covers the floor of the major exhibition space.

Man and Technology – Man and Nature
The section Man and Technology demonstrates the high level of creativity and innovation that humans are capable of when it comes to technology and art. The focus is on man and his position in the interplay between technology, nature, and faith.

In the section man and nature, it is shown that the relation between humans and nature is an emotional, aesthetic, and religious connection, which changed over the centuries. The term "natural landscape" developed because of the industrialization and its impact on nature and landscape.

Archive and library
The Zeppelin Collection and LZ Archives form a competency center on the history of German airship building, whilst the art department carries out research in the field of Lake Constance regional art and crafts.

LZ archive
The corporate archive of the Zeppelin airship-building limited company in Friedrichshafen fills a depot of the Zeppelin Museum. The archive stores documents on every business transaction of the company, from the very beginnings through the 1960s. It also includes Count Zeppelin’s correspondence from the time he conceived his airship-building project.
In addition, the archives contain the estates of important personages of Zeppelin history such as Hugo Eckener, Hans von Schiller, and Wilhelm Ernst Dörr. Collections of construction drawings, posters, prints, newspaper cuttings, photographs, films, etc., complete the archive collections.

Library
The library holds and collects publications on the subjects of the museum’s two departments. The bulk of the collection is composed of books and journals on the history and technology of regional, national, and international aviation; and on Zeppelin development; as well as biographies of the personages and the stories of the companies involved in these fields. The library collects a great number and variety of art books and journals. The library is an open-shelf, non-lending library which means that the books and journals are freely accessible on shelves in the reading room, but may only be read there.

Museum shop
The museum shop offers books, watches and jewellery, model construction kits, calendars, collectible items, DVDs, and other items. Beside zeppelin souvenirs, all available publications on the collection themes and catalogues of the exhibits can also be acquired.

References

External links

 Homepage

Aerospace museums in Germany
Art museums and galleries in Germany
Zeppelins
Museums in Baden-Württemberg
Museums established in 1996
1996 establishments in Germany
Friedrichshafen